Evergreen Township is a civil township of Sanilac County in the U.S. state of Michigan. The population was 961 at the 2020 census.

Geography

Demographics

As of the census of 2000, there were 995 people, 345 households, and 265 families residing in the township. There were 380 housing units at an average density of 10.7 per square mile (4.1/km2). The racial makeup of the township was 96.08% White, 0.80% African American, 0.30% Native American, 1.11% from other races, and 1.71% from two or more races. Hispanic or Latino of any race were 1.61% of the population.

There were 345 households, out of which 33.0% had children under the age of 18 living with them, 62.0% were married couples living together, 9.0% had a female householder with no husband present, and 22.9% were non-families. 16.5% of all households were made up of individuals, and 5.8% had someone living alone who was 65 years of age or older.  The average household size was 2.87 and the average family size was 3.19.

In the township the population was spread out, with 27.4% under the age of 18, 10.4% from 18 to 24, 27.6% from 25 to 44, 23.4% from 45 to 64, and 11.2% who were 65 years of age or older.  The median age was 36 years. For every 100 females, there were 118.2 males.  For every 100 females age 18 and over, there were 111.1 males.

The median income for a household in the township was $36,202, and the median income for a family was $38,250. Males had a median income of $28,077 versus $22,941 for females. The per capita income for the township was $15,814.  About 4.9% of families and 8.2% of the population were below the poverty line, including 5.1% of those under age 18 and 5.7% of those age 65 or over.

Unincorporated communities
 Shabbona – Located at the intersection of Shabbona Road and Decker Road. Named in honor of Shabbona, the American Indian chief.

References

Townships in Sanilac County, Michigan
Townships in Michigan